John W. Smith was a 19th-century footballer.

Career
Smith joined Burslem Port Vale in June 1892 and made his debut at left-half in a 4–0 defeat at Sheffield United on 17 December 1892. He was a regular in the side from September 1893, but his career ground to halt on New Years Day 1894 as he injured an ankle in a 3–1 defeat at Middlesbrough Ironopolis. He played few games from then until his release in the summer of 1895.

Career statistics
Source:

References

Year of birth missing
Year of death missing
English footballers
Association football wing halves
Port Vale F.C. players
English Football League players